Ary Beira Fontoura (born 27 January 1933) is a Brazilian actor, writer, director, poet and TV-presenter. He was born in Curitiba, Paraná.

Filmography

Television

Telenovelas 
 2020 - Salve-se quem Puder .... Himself
 2019 - A Dona do Pedaço .... Dr. Antero/Ângela
 2018 - Orgulho e Paixão .... Afrânio Cavalcante
 2016 - Êta Mundo Bom! ... Joaquim Pereira (Quinzinho)
 2013 - Amor à Vida ... Dr. Lutero Moura Cardoso
 2012 - Gabriela ... Coronel Coriolano
 2012 - As Brasileiras ... Jardel (Episódio: A Inocente de Brasília)
 2011 - Morde & Assopra ... Isaías "Zazá" Junqueira Alves
 2010 - A Cura .... Dr. Turíbio Guedes
 2009 - Caras & Bocas .... Jacques Michel Conti
 2008 - A Favorita .... Silveirinha
 2007 - Sete Pecados .... Romeu
 2003 - Chocolate com Pimenta .... Ludovico Canto e Melo
 2001 - Porto dos Milagres .... Deputado Pitágoras William Mackenzie
 1999 - Vila Madalena .... Elpídio Menezes (Menêz)
 1998 - Meu Bem Querer .... Delegado Neris
 1997 - A Indomada .... Deputado Pitágoras William Mackenzie
 1996 - Vira-Lata .... Aurélio
 1995 - Engraçadinha, seus amores e seus pecados .... Uncredited
 1994 - A Viagem .... Tibério Campos
 1992 - Deus nos Acuda .... Félix Santana
 1990 - Araponga .... General Perácio
 1989 - Tieta .... Coronel Artur da Tapitanga
 1988 - Bebê a Bordo .... Nero Petraglia
 1986 - Hipertensão .... Romeu
 1985 - Roque Santeiro .... Prefeito Florindo Abelha, "Seu Flô”
 1984 - Amor com Amor Se Paga .... Nonô Correia
 1983 - Guerra dos Sexos .... Dino
 1983 - Paraíso .... Padre Bento
 1981 - Jogo da Vida .... Celinho
 1980 - Plumas e Paetês .... Raul
 1979 - Marron Glacê .... Ernani
 1978 - Dancin' Days .... Ubirajara Martins Franco
 1977 - À Sombra dos Laranjais .... Tomé Caldas / Estopim
 1977 - Nina .... Fialho
 1976 - Saramandaia .... Aristóbulo
 1975 - Gabriela .... Dr. Pelópidas Clóvis Costa
 1974 - O Espigão .... Baltazar Camará
 1973 - O Semideus .... Mauro
 1972 - Uma Rosa com Amor .... Afrânio
 1972 - Bandeira 2 .... Apolinário
 1971 - O Cafona .... Profeta
 1970 - Assim na Terra Como no Céu .... Rodolfo Augusto
 1970 - Verão Vermelho
 1969 - A Ponte dos Suspiros
 1969 - Rosa Rebelde .... Conde
 1968 - Passo dos Ventos .... Professor de Equitação de Vivien
 1962 - O Vigilante Rodoviário (Episódio: Aventura em Vila Velha)

Special in TV Globo
A Farsa da Boa Preguiça - de Ariano Suassuna, com direção de Luiz de Carvalho
O Fantasma de Canterville - de Oscar Wilde, com direção de Daniel Filho
Didi Malazartes - com direção de Rogério Gomes
O Matador - de Oduvaldo Viana Filho, com direção de Sérgio Britto

Series
 Plantão de Polícia - TV Globo
 Carga Pesada - TV Globo
 Você Decide - TV Globo
 Engraçadinha, seus amores e seus pecados - TV Globo
 Negro Léo - TV Globo
 Agosto - TV Globo
 Rua da Matriz - TV Globo
 Sai de Baixo - TV Globo
 Sítio do Picapau Amarelo - TV Globo
 Sítio do Picapau Amarelo - TV Globo

Cinema
A Guerra dos Rocha 
O Vigilante Rodoviário 
As Sete Faces de um Cafajeste 
Os Raptores 
Motel 
Os Mansos 
Banana Mecânica 
Mar de Rosas
Os Sete Gatinhos 
O Beijo 
Um Uísque Antes, um Cigarro Depois 
Até que o Casamento nos Separe 
A Serpente 
Massacre no Supermercado 
Os Paqueras 
O Torturador
Ed Mort 
Se Eu Fosse Você 
Xuxa Gêmeas 
Se Eu Fosse Você 2

Theater 
 Ópera do Malandro, of Chico Buarque, 1979

Notes

1933 births
Living people
Male actors from Curitiba
Brazilian male film actors
Brazilian male stage actors
Brazilian male television actors
Brazilian male telenovela actors